is the well-known nickname of Nichibo Kaizuka, a factory volleyball team of Dai Nippon Spinning Co., Ltd. (later, Nichibo, thereafter, Unitika) in Kaizuka, Osaka given by the reports of European media when they achieved 24 consecutive victories against other national teams on the expedition to Europe.

Overview
On November 27, 1953, Dai Nippon Spinning Co., Ltd. (later, Unitika) determined to establish the women's  volleyball team at its factory in Kaizuka, Osaka. Hirofumi Daimatsu who brought up players who later came to be called "Oriental Witches" became the coach. On March 15, 1954, the women's volleyball team, commonly called "Nichibo Kaizuka", was established at the factory in Kaizuka, based on Daimatsu's goal, "To become No. 1 team in Japan in 2 years". At the time of establishment, the team which consisted mostly of fresh graduates could shine only in small tournaments but could barely come 8th place in the national competitions.

Strenuous practice began to pay off and in 1955 the team won the first victory in All-Japan Women's Corporate 9-player Volleball Championship and also won the victory in the National Sports Festival of Japan. Totally the team won 3 titles.

In 1958, the team assumed the hegemony in 5 tournaments, which no team could accomplish previously.
Daimatsu who dominated national tournaments turned his eyes upon world. But there was a big problem. The difference between 9-player system and 6-player system. Japan had been adopting the 9-player system. On the other hand, the international rules required the 6-player system. Daimatsu had to think it over. In 1958, Nichibo Kaizuka switched from 9-person system to 6-person system. The team aimed at 1960 FIVB Volleyball Women's World Championship and continued strenuous practice.

In 1960 FIVB Volleyball Women's World Championship, Japan took the second place.

On the expedition to Europe in 1961, Nichibo Kaizuka won 24 consecutive victories against other national teams. Then European media recognised its achievement, reported as worldwide heroines and gave Nichibo Kaizuka the nickname "Oriental Witches".

In 1962 FIVB Volleyball Women's World Championship, how competitive Japan's national team, which was composed of all Nichibo Kaizuka players but two and already feared as "Oriental Witches", could be against Soviet Union was in focus. By using kaiten reshību, method of rotating on the court and receiving ball, Japan took the first place. Few thought that this would happen again.

After 1962 FIVB Volleyball Women's World Championship the team traveled around the world as reward of victory. As most of team members were of marriageable age, they, including Daimatsu, were thinking of retirement.

It was decided that volleyball became an official event from 1964 Summer Olympics. Japan Volleyball Association asked them to continue and fans sent Hirofumi Daimatsu about 5,000 letters of asking continuation. The team leader Masae Kasai made up her mind as they had 2 years left until 1964 Tokyo  Olympics and with the single phrase "Follow me" by Daimatsu, members of Oriental Witches decided to continue to play. Thereafter, for 2 years they were engaged in company's business all morning and practiced from 15:00 until 26:00. Daimatsu was engaged in company's business until 16:00 and joined the practice.。

On October 23, 1964, Japan faced off against Soviet Union at Tokyo Olympics. Japan took two sets smoothly but the persistence of Soviet Union continued after Japan reached to the match point. The play-by-play announcer Bunya Suzuki repeated the phrase, "Gold Medal Point" six times. Finally because of the foul of overnet by Soviet Union the victory of Japan was decided.

The following players represented Japan in 1964 Tokyo Olympics.

Players who belonged to Nichibo Kaizuka；
Masae Kasai
Emiko Miyamoto
Kinuko Tanida
Yuriko Handa
Yoshiko Matsumura
Sata Isobe
Katsumi Matsumura
Yoko Shinozaki
Setsuko Sasaki
Yuko Fujimoto
Player who belonged to Kurashiki Spinning
Masako Kondo
Player who belonged to Yashica
Ayano Shibuki

Video

Video of the moments of victory and of awarding gold medal in Tokyo Olympics, narrated in German

Gallery

See also
Kurowashiki All Japan Volleyball Tournament
V.League (Japanese Volleyball League)

References

External links
Former site of Unitika Kaizuka Factory / Kaizuka City, Osaka Prefecture 
 The birth of Nichibo Kaizuka Volleyball Team / Kaizuka City, Osaka Prefecture 
Kinuko Idogawa, One of "Oriental Witches" in 1964 Tokyo Olympics, Dies / JIJI PRESS NEWS 
 Legendary gymnasium, Osakd, Kaizuka City 
 Sata Maruyama (née Isobe) passed away at 72. (The second player from the right in the photograph) / THE MAINICHI NEWSPAPERS 

Japanese volleyball teams
Volleyball clubs established in 1954
Sports teams in Osaka Prefecture
1954 establishments in Japan